The Oxapampa poison frog (Ameerega planipaleae; formerly Epipedobates planipaleae) is a species of frog in the family Dendrobatidae endemic to Peru near Oxapampa, in the Pasco Region.
Its natural habitat is montane tropical rainforest. It is a very rare species threatened by habitat loss.

References

Ameerega
Amphibians of Peru
Endemic fauna of Peru
Amphibians described in 1998
Taxonomy articles created by Polbot